Benin competed at the 2009 World Championships in Athletics from 15–23 August in Berlin.

Team selection
Track and road events

Results

Men

Women

References

External links
Official competition website

Nations at the 2009 World Championships in Athletics
World Championships in Athletics
Benin at the World Championships in Athletics